Jenny Behrend (born 20 January 1996) is a German handball player for SG BBM Bietigheim and the German national team.

She made her debut for the national team in 2019, in a match against the Netherlands. She was selected to represent Germany at the 2019 World Women's Handball Championship in Japan.

Achievements
EHF European League:
Winner: 2022
Bundesliga:
Winner: 2022

References

External links

1996 births
Living people
People from Rendsburg
German female handball players
Sportspeople from Schleswig-Holstein
21st-century German women